The Shuang River is a river in Taiwan. It flows through the eponymous Shuangxi District and Gongliao District in eastern New Taipei City for 27 km. Fulong Beach, one of the more popular beach destinations in northern Taiwan, is located at the mouth of the Shuang River.

See also
List of rivers in Taiwan

References

Rivers of Taiwan
Landforms of New Taipei